William Leo Epton Jr. (January 17, 1932 – January 23, 2002) was a Maoist African-American communist activist. He was Vice Chairman of the Progressive Labor Party until about 1970.

Epton was "the first person convicted of criminal anarchy since the Red Scare of 1919."

Origins

According to his New York Times obituary, Epton, a Harlem native, was a firebrand even early in his youth. "Even as a high school student," the obituary reads, "he demonstrated for civil rights and helped organize unions. He was drafted into the Army and served in the Korean War." Later, he became an electrician and gravitated towards the Progressive Labor Movement and its activities.

Background to the Epton court case

On July 16, 1964, NYPD officer Thomas Gilligan shot and killed a 15-year-old African-American student, James Powell. In response the people of Harlem started days of demonstrations that intensified into street violence.

PL, with Epton among its leadership, hung posters reading Wanted For Murder – Gilligan the Cop throughout the city, causing the city administration to declare a state of emergency in the city, prohibiting public demonstration. While most of the reformist leaders went along with the ban, Epton and the Harlem branch of PL called for a peaceful rally on 125th Street for July 25. When they began to march, Epton was arrested. Charged with criminal anarchy, he was tried and found guilty, receiving a one-year prison sentence.

The trial was postponed to August 2, 1965. There was talk in the papers that the riot's circumstances had been that of "a social revolution – a demand by a minority for equal rights" (N.Y. Times, July 7, 1965).

We Accuse

Epton wrote a militant speech he made to the court at his sentencing hearing. Progressive Labor Party published it as a pamphlet on February 2, 1966. In part, the text reads:

The New York Times article notes: "A grand jury indicted Mr. Epton on charges that his speeches kept the 1964 riot going. In one, which was secretly recorded by an undercover officer assigned to monitor the Progressive Labor Party, he said, "We're going to have to kill a lot of cops, a lot of the judges, and we'll have to go against their army."

Epton breaks with PL

Epton was eventually released on bail while he appealed his conviction. Meanwhile, Progressive Labor began to change its line on the national question, the developments of which Epton apparently found politically unacceptable. They criticized the concept of "revolutionary" nationalism and specifically criticized the call for "national liberation" made by the Vietnamese Communist Party and the Vietnamese NLF.

After Epton left PL, he was involved in new attempts to unite revolutionary Marxists in the U.S. in the early 1970s. The appeal of his conviction was eventually rejected and he was forced to serve the remainder of that year in prison. However, such activity as Epton had engaged in was ruled to be constitutional a mere two years after Epton's imprisonment. The New York Times obituary article says that Leon Friedman of Hofstra University School of Law noted: "They changed the rules. Had the new rule been in effect, he [Epton] probably would have won."

Epton played a founding role in the A. Philip Randolph Labor Council. He was also an information officer and printer at the New York City Board of Education after serving a year on Rikers Island. He died at a local hospital in his hometown of Harlem in 2002. He was survived by two children and three grandchildren.

References

Manning, Lona. "[Rubin "Hurricane"] Carter's phony radical credentials." Source for Bill Epton picture, obtained here: 
We Accuse: Bill Epton Speaks to the Court. Progressive Labor Party, February 2, 1966. Excerpted from MLTranslations.org.

1932 births
2002 deaths
African-American activists
American Maoists
People from Harlem
Progressive Labor Party (United States)
African-American communists
Anti-revisionists